Ghost is Not Real is the second full-length album by Finnish ambient pop band Husky Rescue. It was released on Catskills Records on January 15, 2007. The Helsinki-based band, originally a one-man show orchestrated by Marko Nyberg, started with the intention of producing cinematic music inspired by the "power of films and hypnotic quality of photography." Even though the band has changed, now a four-sometimes-five member band with female lead singer, the original intentions are still there on the group's latest album Ghost Is Not Real, a collection of songs that, as the above quote suggests, makes for perfect company as we waltz through time and space into the dead of winter.

Track listing 
"My Home Ghost"
"Diamonds in the Sky"
"Nightless Night"
"Blueberry Tree Part I"
"Blueberry Tree Part II"
"Blueberry Tree Part III"
"Hurricane (Don't Come Knocking)"
"Silent Woods"
"Shadow Run"
"Caravan"

Peaks

Singles 
"My Home Ghost" (2006)
"Diamonds In The Sky" (2006)
"Nightless Night" (2007)
"Caravan" (2007)

Credits 
 Marko Nyberg - bass, music & Lyrics
 Reeta-Leena Korhola - vocals
 Villee Riippa - keyboards
 Anssi Sopanen - drums
 Miika Colliander - guitar

References

External links 
Husky Rescue Official Site
Husky Rescue Official MySpace

2007 albums
Husky Rescue albums